The following is a list of notables places in Târgu Mureș, Romania.

Historical places

Places of worship 
 Ascension of the Lord Orthodox Cathedral
 Bob Church 
 Evangelical Church
 Franciscan Church
 Fortress Church
 Great Synagogue
 Minorita Church
 Nicholas Church
 St. Elisabeth Chapel
 St. John the Baptist Parish Church
 St. John of Nepomuk Church
 Small Reformed Church
 St. Michael Wooden Orthodox Church
 Unitarian Church

Historical buildings 

 Palace of Justice
 Apolló Palace
 Bányai House
 Bissingen House
 Bolyai House
 Culture Palace 
 Görög House
 Kendeffy House
 Lábas House
 Legények House
 Teleki Library
 Teleki House
 Toldalagi Palace
 Tolnai House
 Hotel Transzilvánia

Statues and historical monuments 
 Avram Iancu monument (Avram Iancu)
 Bartók Béla Statue (Bartók Béla)
 Bem Józef Statue (Józef Bem)
 Capitoline Wolf Statue (Capitoline Wolf)
 Emil Dandea Statue (Emil Dandea)
 Bolyai Farkas and János Statue (Farkas Bolyai and János Bolyai)
 Aurel Filimon Statue (Aurel Filimon)
 Holocaust Statue (Holocaust)
 Kossuth Lajos Statue (Lajos Kossuth)
 Károly Kós Statue (Károly Kós)
 Kőrösi Csoma Sándor Statue (Sándor Kőrösi Csoma)
 Márton Áron Statue (Áron Márton)
 Michael the Brave statue (Michael the Brave)
 Sándor Petőfi Statue (Sándor Petőfi)
 Szentgyörgyi István Statue (István Szentgyörgyi)
 Székely martyrs' sculpture

External links

Târgu Mureș
Places in Târgu Mureș
Târgu Mureș